Jonnie Boer (born January 9, 1965 in Giethoorn) is a Dutch Michelin star winning head chef and co-owner of the restaurant De Librije in Zwolle, Netherlands.

Together with his wife and business partner Thérèse Boer he runs the 3-starred De Librije (in 16th century monastery library building) and Librije's Winkel (cooking shop)
They also own Librije's Hotel and Librije's Atelier (cook- and wine school), all located in a former women prison.

In 1989 Boer became head chef at De Librije. In 1992 he and his wife bought the restaurant. Michelin awarded the first star in 1993. Five years later Michelin awarded Jonnie Boer his second star. In 2004 Boer was awarded his third star.

Jonnie Boer uses nature as his source of inspiration to develop new dishes, but also as basis of his cooking.

Controversy
In February 2011 the local paper De Stentor reported that Jonnie Boer was in financial trouble. Fact was that the Librije Group was hit by the economic recession and had to cut costs. The firebrand sale at order from the banks of restaurant Koperen Kees was nonsense, according to Jonnie Boer. Boer claimed that the sale of Koperen Kees was one of priorities, the theater-formula not fitting with the philosophy of the rest of the Librije Group. Sander Dol became the new owner.

Books
Books by himself or with his wife
 Puur : Restaurant De Librije, Zwolle (Dutch); 1997
 Puurder : Restaurant De Librije, Zwolle (in Dutch and English); 2001
 De Librije : puur eten & drinken (Dutch); 2005
 Purer: The Cooking, Wine & Spirits Bible--Restaurant De Librije Zwolle (English); 2006
 Pure Passie : makkelijke recepten uit de keuken van De Librije, wijntips en leuke anekdotes (Dutch); 2009

Books written with others
 Puur natuurlijk : Restaurant De Librije, Zwolle (Dutch); 2003
 En Cas : Jonnie Boer, Alwin Houwing, Nico Boreas, Robert van Beckhoven, Edwin Kats, Ronald Tausch en Cas Spijkers (Dutch); 2005
 Duvel à la carte (Dutch); 2005
 Lang leve vis : visrecepten van vierentwintig topkoks (Dutch); 2007
 Met Gort de Boer op : de wonderbaarlijke avonturen van twee fijnproevers op een zoektocht naar 100 jaar Cuisine Hollandaise (Dutch); 2007
 Met Gort de Boer op : de wonderbaarlijke avonturen van twee fijnproevers op een zoektocht naar 100 jaar Cuisine Hollandaise (Dutch, ebook); 2008
 Eten, drinken, slapen (Dutch); 2010 
 Grote kookkunsten : "een kookboek voor en door kinderen" : met 65 lievelingsrecepten van kinderen van de Geert Groteschool in Zwolle (Dutch); 2010

See also
 De Librije

References

External links 
 Official website "De Librije"
 Jonnie Boer – Bravo!

1965 births
Living people
Dutch chefs
People from Steenwijkerland
Head chefs of Michelin starred restaurants